Robin Rakotonirina (born 28 May 1985) is a retired Malagasy football goalkeeper.

References

1985 births
Living people
Malagasy footballers
Madagascar international footballers
Association football goalkeepers
People from Boeny